Olight is a flashlight brand that was founded in 2007 by Fox Fan. The brand is headquartered in Shenzhen, China, and has operations in Georgia, United States.

Olight specializes in the production of flashlights, including LED flashlights, survival lights, and tactical flashlights. In addition, it also produces headlamps, and batteries.

Olight provides lights for law enforcement, military, and outdoor activity enthusiasts. It also has a series of lanterns, Olantern, which features LED lights combined with detachable covers.

History
Olight, which was established by Fox Fan in Shenzhen in 2007, currently focuses on flashlights that can be rechargeable.

Olight's first headlamp and first weapon flashlight were presented in 2012 and 2015 respectively.

In 2014, it launched a new product with a light range of 810 meters, and then a torch with a magnet function.

In 2015, the brand rolled out the S2 Baton, which is small in size but high in brightness, with a total internal reflection (TIR) lens and a magnetized bottom.

Olight launched the tactical flashlight WARRIOR X at the end of 2018. It participated in the SHOT Show in January 2019.

References

Flashlights
Lighting brands
Consumer electronics brands
Products introduced in 2007